Siphlonurus occidentalis is a species of primitive minnow mayfly in the family Siphlonuridae. It is found in Central America, North America. In North America its range includes southwestern, northern Canada, all of Mexico, the western United States, and Alaska.

References

External links

 

Siphlonuridae
Articles created by Qbugbot
Insects described in 1885